Karataş Islets are two Mediterranean islets in Turkey.

According to the municipality of Karataş these two islets were named  "Didimae" in the antiquity. Currently, the islands are uninhabited. But, the ruins around the islets show that these islets were inhabited in the antiquity. According to the researcher İsa Besiç, during the construction of some 19th-century buildings in the mainland (Anatolia) construction material from the islets were used.

References

Islands of Turkey
Islands of Adana Province
Karataş
Mediterranean islands